William Conyngham Greene (19 October 1827 – 9 August 1910) was an Anglican priest in the late 18th and early 19th centuries. He was the son of Richard Wilson Greene, judge of the Court of Exchequer (Ireland) and Elizabeth Wilson, daughter of Thomas Wilson of Fulford, North Yorkshire. His nephew was the eminent diplomat Sir Conyngham Greene. He was educated at Trinity College Dublin, and ordained in 1850. He was a curate at St Anne's, Dublin, and then held four successive Dublin incumbencies; St Peter's, St Michael's, St John's and St Werburgh's. In 1987 he became Dean of Christ Church Cathedral, Dublin, a post he held for 21 years. He died on 9 August 1910.

References

1827 births
1910 deaths
Alumni of Trinity College Dublin
Deans of Christ Church Cathedral, Dublin